The South Bay Lakers are an American professional basketball team in the NBA G League based in Los Angeles. Founded in 2006 as the Los Angeles D-Fenders, the team is owned by the Los Angeles Lakers, who were the first National Basketball Association (NBA) franchise to own a D-League team. At the conclusion of the 2016–17 D-League season, the D-Fenders re-branded as the South Bay Lakers for the G League. They also moved their home games from the Toyota Sports Center into the UCLA Health Training Center, a new practice facility for the Los Angeles Lakers in El Segundo.

All games are broadcast in streaming audio from the team's official website and on the NBA's Futurecast web channel. On December 21, 2012, the D-Fenders announced a telecast agreement with TWC SportsNet Channel (now Spectrum SportsNet).

History

The Dan Panaggio era (2006–2009)
The team name was chosen in a "name the team" contest with a format similar to a March Madness NCAA tournament bracket, with 64 possible team names. From April 2006 to the first week of June 2006, the choices were whittled down to two: "D-Fenders" and "Breakers" remained. On June 5, 2006, balloting was closed with the "Breakers" as the winner. Three days later the team was expected to announce its name, but the Lakers organization had learned that a local coed dwarf basketball team already had the name. The Lakers then fell back to the "losing" name: the Los Angeles D-Fenders. The official announcement and logo unveiling came on July 26, 2006.

In their debut season (2006–07) the D-Fenders competed in the Western Division and finished with a 23–27 record. Despite a sub-500 record the D-Fenders almost qualified for the playoffs. Dan Panaggio, formerly the assistant head coach of the Portland Trail Blazers, served as head coach. Brian Chase received an All D-League Honorable Mention and was selected for the D-League All-Star Game. Stephane Lasme received the D-Fenders first ever "call up" to the NBA's Miami Heat.

D-Fender games were played as "doubleheaders" with their parent club, the Los Angeles Lakers (either prior to or following Laker games). Admission tickets to Lakers games also admitted one to the D-Fender game. On April 1, 2007, Jordan Farmar became the first player in history to play in an NBA game and a D-League game in the same day.

In the 2007–08 season, Panaggio returned as head coach, and the D-Fenders improved to 32–18, strong enough to qualify for the playoffs. In the first round, the D-Fenders earned their first playoff victory after defeating the Western Conference Champion Colorado 14ers. In the second round the D-Fenders lost to the Idaho Stampede, who went on to win the D-League Championship. Stephane Lasme shared the D-League Defensive Player of the Year Award and received an All D-League Honorable Mention. Lasme was also selected for the All-Star Game. Jelani McCoy was named All D-League Third Team and selected to the All-Star Game. McCoy also received a "call-up" to the NBA to play for the Denver Nuggets. Panaggio was named the All-Star game head coach. Coby Karl, son of NBA Coach George Karl, became the 2nd player in history to play in an NBA game and a D-League game in the same day.

In 2008–09, Panaggio returned for his third and final year as head coach. The D-Fenders posted a disappointing 19–31 record. One highlight showcased Orien Greene making eight steals in one game against Utah (December 1, 2009). Joe Crawford received an All D-League Honorable Mention and was "called up" to the NBA to play for the New York Knicks. Rookie guard Sun Yue became the third Lakers player to play for the D-Fenders.

For the first time the D-Fenders played several of their home games at the Citizens Business Bank Arena in nearby Ontario, California. This marked the first time that admission for D-Fenders' home games was charged solely for the D-Fenders as the main attraction. Attendance averaged approximately 1,500 paid sales per game. The D-Fenders continued to play occasional home games at Staples Center and eventually signed a long-term contract with Staples Center for the remainder of the third season and beyond.

Post-Panaggio era (2009–2011) 
For the 2009–10 season, the D-Fenders brought in a "new" coach, Chucky Brown For Brown, this served a bit as a homecoming as Brown previously served as the Assistant Head Coach in the D-Fenders' inaugural season. Unfortunately, the experiment did not work out as the D-Fenders posted a record of 16–34. This season marked the first time the D-Fenders had no assignments or call-ups from the NBA. Joe Crawford and Diamon Simpson were selected for the All-Star Game. Crawford was also a participant in the All-Star Weekend H-O-R-S-E Contest. Dar Tucker was named All-Star Weekend Slam Dunk Champion.

In May 2010, the D-Fenders announced that they would not field a team for the 2010–11 season. While the Lakers retained team ownership the D-Fenders took this time to perform some housecleaning. Coach Brown's contract was not renewed and Assistant General Manager Bonnie Jill Laflin was released. In the absence of the D-Fenders fielding a team, the Lakers affiliated with the Bakersfield Jam who also served as an affiliate to the Los Angeles Clippers.

On June 9, 2011, the D-Fenders announced they would return for the 2011–2012 campaign and would play home games at a new location: the Toyota Sports Center in El Segundo. In addition to housing the headquarters for the Los Angeles Lakers and D-Fenders organizations, the TSC offers a unique setting to watch some of the brightest young stars in professional basketball as only 365 seats are available for public sale and no seat is further than six rows from the court. This good news was tempered by the looming NBA lockout and a desire by the Lakers organization to cut overhead. One early casualty was D-Fender General Manager Ronnie Lester. Lester, who had a 24-year association with the Lakers, could not come to terms with the Lakers, and his expiring contract was not renewed along with some other 20 Lakers staffers.

Breakout season (2011–2012) 
Glenn Carraro, the remaining D-Fender assistant general manager, was promoted to general manager. Thereafter, on August 18, 2011, the D-Fenders announced Eric Musselman as their new head coach. Among Musselman's body of work was previous service as head coach for the NBA's Sacramento Kings and Golden State Warriors.

The NBA lockout began and the Los Angeles Laker Girls, who had been practicing all summer for their upcoming Lakers game performances, now had no audience. The Lakers organization decided the Laker Girls would perform at the D-Fender home games for the duration of the season.

With a new general manager, a new head coach, and the excitement of the Laker Girls, the D-Fenders had a breakout season, posting a regular season record of 38–12, which at the time was the best regular season record ever posted in the D-League. In a season of great individual success, two D-Fenders players placed in the top five for season scoring averages: Brandon Costner (20.3 ppg) and Elijah Millsap (19.4 ppg). Malcolm Thomas was named to the All NBA D-League First Team and the Rookie First Team after ranking second in the NBADL for blocks (2.3) and third in rebounds (9.1) and field goal percentage (.619). Both Courtney Fortson and Millsap were named to the All D-League Second Team. Costner was named All D-League Third Team, and Zach Andrews received an Honorable Mention honor. A team record four D-Fenders were selected for the All Star Game: Andrews, Costner, Millsap and Gerald Green. Green was also named the MVP of the All-Star Game. Concluding regular season play, the D-Fenders breezed through the first and second rounds of the playoffs undefeated, easily winning the Western Conference Title. In the finals, the D-fenders took game 1 but dropped the next two games to fall to the Austin Toros. To cap off this historic season, Musselman was named D-League Coach of the Year and the front office earned the first-ever NBA Development League Championship Award, an annual recognition award given to the team that best embodies the NBA D-League's goal of developing NBA basketball talent via call-ups and/or assignments.

Playoff upsets (2012–2015) 
For the 2012–13 campaign, the D-Fenders had a new head coach, former NBA Sacramento Kings Head Coach Reggie Theus. The D-Fenders played a 50-game regular season of which 25 games were scheduled as home games. The Laker Girls decided to stay on and once again performed at all home games. In a year characterized by L.A.'s shuffling of players, the team would finish with a 21–29 record in Theus's only season at the helm. The one constant throughout the year for the D-Fenders was Fortson, who finished the year as the D-League's leader in assists (7.1) and was second in steals (2.0) while also tying a franchise record 15 assists in a single game. He would go on to be named to the NBA D-League All-Star squad, his first career selection to the event.

In May 2013, the D-Fenders named former NBA player Mark Madsen as head coach, but he subsequently accepted a position as a player development coach for the Lakers on July 19, leaving the D-Fenders with a head coaching vacancy. As a result, Bob MacKinnon stepped in as the team's coach, eventually leading the D-Fenders franchise to a 31–21 record and its second West Division title in franchise history. In his first season with the team, in-season acquisition Manny Harris posted 49 points against the Idaho Stampede on January 10, 2014, to set a then Los Angeles D-Fenders franchise record. Harris would go on to become the first player ever called up to the Lakers from the D-Fenders franchise. Three weeks later, on January 31, 2014, Terrence Williams scored 50 points to set a new D-Fenders franchise record. On February 5, 2014, the D-Fenders set an NBA D-League record with 26 three-pointers made along with a franchise record 155 points scored. On February 8, 2014, Harris again set a new franchise scoring record, this time with 56 points. Overall, Williams earned All-NBA D-League third team honors and James Southerland earned All-NBA D-League Rookie second team honors as the D-Fenders suffered an early exit from the NBA D-League Playoffs.

On August 28, 2014, the D-Fenders hired Phil Hubbard as head coach, the team's sixth coach in as many years. Offensive firepower was never an issue for the team, as Jabari Brown finished as the league's leading scorer with 24.4 points per outing. Brown joined Vander Blue and Roscoe Smith as members of the 2015 All-Star Game. Overall, Los Angeles scored the third-most points per game (116.8), while ranking second in points in the paint (57.4) and on fast-break scoring (21.3). The D-Fenders would finish with a record of 17–33 while missing the playoffs.

Final seasons as D-Fenders (2015–2017) 
Ahead of the 2015–16 season, the D-Fenders hired Conner Henry as head coach. However, he left to become an assistant coach for the Orlando Magic. On August 5, Casey Owens was named the head coach of the D-Fenders. Los Angeles eventually advanced to the NBA D-League finals for the second time in franchise history, even as the team finished with a 27–23 regular season record. Ultimately, the D-Fenders would fall one game short of a league championship as the Sioux Falls Skyforce capped off the best season in NBA D-League history. Blue led the league in points scored (1,262) and finished second in scoring average (26.3) en route to a First Team All-NBA D-League selection. Meanwhile, Jeff Ayres (first team) and Ryan Gomes (third team) were also awarded with All-NBA D-League honors. Gomes, an NBA veteran, provided a large boost to the D-Fenders lineup and was named as the NBA D-League's Impact Player of the Year after averaging 18.2 points, 8.1 rebounds and 3.1 assists. Point guard Josh Magette led the league in assists (9.2) and steals (2.4), while two D-Fenders earned GATORADE Call-Ups: Ayres (L.A. Clippers) and Justin Harper (Detroit Pistons).

On September 12, 2016, the D-Fenders announced the addition of Coby Karl as the team's head coach prior to the 2016–17 season. Karl, the son of NBA coaching legend George Karl, was a former player for the Lakers and D-Fenders. The second person to ever play in an NBA and NBADL game in the same day, Karl entered his first head coaching position in Los Angeles.

Rebrand as South Bay Lakers (2017–present) 
On April 9, 2017, the Los Angeles Lakers announced that the D-Fenders would be re-branded as the South Bay Lakers at the conclusion of the 2016–17 season and the playoffs.  They also announced that they were leaving the Toyota Events Center and moving into the new UCLA Health Training Center in El Segundo, which would also serve at the Lakers new practice facility.  After the D-Fenders were eliminated from the D-League playoffs on April 11, 2017, the team began the re-branding process. The newly re-branded club unveiled its primary and secondary marks on April 8, 2017.

The 2018–19 South Bay Lakers placed fourth in the Pacific Division and had a record of 21–29, missing the playoffs. The 2019–20 season was curtailed due to the onset of the COVID-19 pandemic while the Lakers were outside of a playoff position, and then the team opted out of the single-site 2021 season. In July 2021, head coach Karl was announced as not returning to the organization and was replaced by Los Angeles Lakers' assistant coach Miles Simon.

Current roster

Executive group

Owner/Governor – Buss family
President/CEO – Joey Buss
General counsel/secretary – Dan Grigsby
Senior vice president/CFO – Joe McCormack

Operations group

General manager – Nick Mazzella
Director of basketball operations – Nicholas Lagios
Director of scouting – Jesse Buss
Athletic trainer – Colin Diment
Sales representative – Heather Dominquez
Public relations coordinator – Noah Camarena

Season-by-season record

Head coaches

NBA affiliates

South Bay Lakers
Los Angeles Lakers (2017–present)

Los Angeles D-Fenders
Los Angeles Lakers (2006–2017)

References

External links
 
 D-League Finals Gallery

 
Basketball teams established in 2006
2006 establishments in California
Basketball teams in California